Thomas Kerr Campbell (9 June 1908 – 22 July 1982) was a Scottish amateur football right back who made over 270 appearances in the Scottish League for Queen's Park. He represented Scotland at amateur level and captained the team on one occasion.

References

Scottish footballers
Scottish Football League players
Queen's Park F.C. players
Association football fullbacks
1908 births
Footballers from Glasgow
Scotland amateur international footballers
1982 deaths